Birk (biærk, berck, byrck) was during the Scandinavian Middle Ages the name for a demarcated area, especially a town or a market place, with its own laws and privileges, the Bjarkey laws.

Denmark
In Denmark, the name was to be used also for other areas than towns and markets. These areas were exempted from the ordinary jurisdictions of the hundreds and the towns. There were royal, ecclesiastical and aristocratic birks with their own law courts and birk assemblies. After the Protestant Reformation, the ecclesiastical birks passed to the king.

The royal birks were after some time abolished, but more and more aristocratic ones were established, where the aristocratic landlord (the patronus) appointed birk judges, birk bailiffs, and birk notaries. The aristocratic birk privilege (known by the same name as Bjarkey laws, birkerett) was reduced in 1809 and it was completely abolished in 1849. The term birk was to endure for some time, however.

Norway
In Norway, some counties, baronies and noble estates also had birk privileges, but they were abolished in 1821.

Toponymy
Some scholars have proposed that the place name Birka would have origins in birk, but this theory has not been generally accepted.

Sources
The article Birk in Nationalencyklopedin.

See also
 Birkarls

Market towns
Medieval Denmark
Medieval Sweden
Medieval Norway